Francesco Antonio Zaccaria (March 27, 1714 – October 10, 1795) was an Italian theologian, historian, and prolific writer.

Biography 
Francesco Antonio Zaccaria was born in Venice. His father, Tancredi, was a noted jurist. He joined the Austrian province of the Society of Jesus on 18 October 1731. Zaccaria taught grammar, the humanities, and rhetoric in the College of Gorizia, and was ordained priest at Rome in 1740. He spent some time in pastoral work in Ancona, Fermo, and Pistoia, gaining renown as a preacher and controversial lecturer. In 1751 he succeeded Muratori as ducal archivist and librarian of Modena, but was removed in 1768, owing to his Antifebronio, in which he strenuously defended the rights of the Holy See.

He was then appointed librarian at the Jesuit professed house in Rome. Clement XIII allowed him an annual pension, continued under Clement XIV, and increased by Pius VI, who appointed him professor of church history at the Sapienza and director of the Pontifical Ecclesiastical Academy. He was a member of at least 19 Italian academies.  He died in Rome, aged 81.

Works

Of the 161 printed works ascribed to him by Sommervogel the following are the most important.

Church history
Series episcoporum Cremonensium (Milan, 1749)
Laudensium (ibid., 1763)
Auximatium (Osimo, 1764)
Vico Aequensium (Rome, 1778)
Caesenatium (Cesena, 1779)
Forocorneliensium (Imola, 1820)
De' santi martiri Fedele, Capoforo, Gratiniano, e Felino (Milan, 1750)
Acta SS. Bollandiana apologeticis libris in unum volumen nunc primum contractis vindicata (Antwerp, 1755)
De rebus ad historiam atque antigitates ecclesiae pertinentibus (Foligno, 1781)
Raccolta di dissertazioni di storia ecclesiastica (22 vols., Rome, 1792-7). 
Istoria del Concilio di Trento (Faenza, 1797-7)

Theology and canon law
Thesaurus theologicus (13 vols., Venice, 1762) - a compilation of theological treatises by various authors, arranged so as to form an orderly exposition of the different topics of theology
De casuisticae theologicae originibus, locis atque praestantia, written at the instance of St. Alphonsus Liguori and prefixed to the third edition of the latter's Moral Theology
Apparatus omnigenae eruditionis ad theologiam et jus canonicum (Rome, 1773)

Polemics
Antifebronio (Pesaro, 1767), Latin edition (Cesena, 1771-2 and in Migne, Theol. Cursus Completus, XXVII, 463-1300)
Storia polemica del celibato sacro (Rome, 1774), German translation by Pius John (1783)
Storia polemica delle proibizione de' libri (Rome, 1777)
Difesa di tre Sommi Pontefici Benedetto XIII, Benedetto XIV, e Clemente XIII, e del Concilio Romano tenuto nel 1775 (Ravenna, 1784)
Comandi chi può, ubbidisca chi dee (Faenza, 1788)

Liturgy
Dell'anno santo (Rome, 1774)
Bibliotheca ritualis (2 vols., Rome, 1776-8)
Nuovo effemerologio universale (Rome, 1780)
Onomasticon rituale selectum (Fäenza, 1787)

Archaeology
istituzione antiquario-lapidaria (Rome, 1770)
Istituzione antiquario-numismatica (Rome, 1772)

Literary history
Storia Letteraria d'Italia (14 vols., Modena, 1750–57) - a literary review edited by Zaccaria with the assistance of Leonard Ximenes, Dominicus Froili, and Joachim Gabardi
Excursus litterarii per Italiam (Venice, 1754)
Iter Litterarium per Italiam (Venice, 1762)
Saggio critico della corrente letteratura straniera (3 vols., Modena, 1576), written by Zaccaria, with Gabardi and Froili
Annali letterarii d'Italia (3 vols., Modena, 1762-3)
Biblioteca antica e moderna di storia letteraria (3 vols., Pesaro, 1766-8)

Annotated editions
Joannes Stephanus Menochius (the jesuit Giovanni Stefano Menochio), Commentarius totius s. Scripturae (Venice, 1743)
Dante, La Divina Comedia (Verona, 1749)
Tamburini, Theologia Moralis (Venice, 1755)
Busenbaum and Lacroix, Theologia Moralis (1755)
Domenico Viva, Opuscula omnia theologico-moralia (Ferrara, 1757)
Louis Abelly, Medulla theologica (Venice, 1757)
Petavius, Opus de ulla theologica (Venice, 1757)
Vitus Pichler, Jus Canonicum (Pesaro, 1758)
Jacobus Tirinus (Jacques Tirin), In universam Scripturam Commentarius (Venice, 1759)
Bartolomeo Gavanto, Opera theologico-canonica (Ferrara, 1760)
Honoré Tournély, Praelectiones (Venice, 1765)
Alexander Natalis, Historia Ecclesiastica (Venice, 1776-7)
Lucius Ferraris, Bibliotheca canonicojuridica (Rome, 1748–90)
Francesco Sforza Pallavicino, Istoria del Concilio di trento (Faenza, 1792-7)

Bibliography 
 
 Carlos Sommervogel et al., Bibliothèque de la Compagnie de Jésus, 11 v. (Brussels–Paris 1890–1932; v. 12, suppl. 1960) 8:1381–1435.
 Hugo von Hurter, Nomenclator literarius theologiae catholicae, 5 v. in 6 (3d ed. Innsbruck 1903–13); v. 1 (4th ed. 1926) 5.1:484–498.

Further reading 
 

1714 births
1795 deaths
18th-century Venetian historians
18th-century Italian Jesuits
18th-century Italian Roman Catholic theologians